Tian Jiyun (born June 1929 in Feicheng, Shandong) is a retired politician in the People's Republic of China, known as a supporter of Deng Xiaoping's reforms. The best-known feature of his biography is the speech of 1992, delivered in the Central Party School, in which he ridicules the "leftists" (those who did not support the new policy of openness). Tian proposed they establish their own "economic zones" preserving all the worst features of the old system.

Biography
Between 1981 and 1983, Tian served as the deputy secretary general of the State Council. He was promoted to the secretary general in 1983, and served as the vice premier of the State Council between 1983 and 1993.

Tian joined the Chinese Communist Party at the age of 16. He has been a member of the National Congress of the Chinese Communist Party since 1982, and joined the politburo in 1987.

Tian was elected the vice chairman of the Standing Committee of the National People's Congress in 1993 and 1998. Tian retired in 2002 at the age of 73.

External links
 Biography of Tian Jiyun, Xinhuanet

1929 births
Living people
Chinese Communist Party politicians from Shandong
Politicians from Tai'an
People's Republic of China politicians from Shandong
Vice Premiers of the People's Republic of China
Members of the 15th Politburo of the Chinese Communist Party
Members of the 14th Politburo of the Chinese Communist Party
Members of the 13th Politburo of the Chinese Communist Party
Members of the 12th Politburo of the Chinese Communist Party
Vice Chairpersons of the National People's Congress